Amarina is a locality between the towns of Casino and Grafton in northern New South Wales, Australia. The North Coast railway passes through, and a railway station was provided between 1908 and 1975.

References

Disused regional railway stations in New South Wales
Northern Rivers
Railway stations in Australia opened in 1908
Railway stations closed in 1975